The Boys Who Cried Wolf, also known as The Shepherd, is a 2015 South Korean crime thriller drama film. Written and directed by Kim Jin-hwang in his first feature-length for his Korean Academy of Film Arts (KAFA)'s final year undergraduate film project, it depicts how a former stage actor becomes involved in a murder case.

It made its world premiere at the 20th Busan International Film Festival in 2015 and won the DGK Award. It was also invited to the 15th edition of New York Asian Film Festival in 2016 to be screened as the North American premiere.

Synopsis
Wan-joo (Park Jong-hwan), enraged at being replaced by another actor, quits theatre school and now works as a role play in "real-life". One day, a woman asks him to be a witness for her son's murder case. Desperate for money for his mother's surgery, he agrees. When he realizes his false testimony implicates an innocent young man as the murderer, and discovers the murdered victim is an orphan and the woman who hired him isn't who she claims to be, he decides to search for the truth.

Cast
 Park Jong-hwan as Ji Wan-joo
 Cha Rae-hyung as Myung-woo
 Ha Jun as Kwang-suk
 Yoon Jung-il as Young-min 
 Kim Ye-eun as Mi-jin 
 Oh Chang-kyung as Homicide detective Park
 Ryu Jun-yeol as Dong-chul
 Lee Ga-sub as Joon-ho

Production
The Boys Who Cried Wolf is director Kim Jin-hwang's final year undergraduate film project at the Korean Academy of Film Arts (KAFA). In addition to the original story and directing, Kim also wrote, edited, and co-produced the film.

Awards and nominations

References

External links
 
 
 

2015 films
2015 crime thriller films
2015 thriller drama films
South Korean crime thriller films
2010s Korean-language films
2015 drama films
South Korean thriller drama films
2010s South Korean films